The Nagaibak dialect is a dialect spoken by the Nagaibak, a Turkic ethnic subgroup living in Russia. It is a dialect of the Tatar language. Many speakers live in Fershampenuaz.

References

Tatar language